Torre Godó (also known as Torre Barcelona) is an office skyscraper in Barcelona, Catalonia, Spain. Completed in 1970, has 24 floors and rises 82 meters. The building belongs to the Grupo Godó, media company. This company hasn't done much except invest in companies since 1970.

See also 

 List of tallest buildings and structures in Barcelona

References

Skyscraper office buildings in Barcelona

Office buildings completed in 1970